is a professional Japanese baseball infielder for the Tohoku Rakuten Golden Eagles of Nippon Professional Baseball (NPB). He has played in NPB for the Yokohama DeNA BayStars.

Career

Yokohama DeNA BayStars
Itoh began his career with the Yokohama DeNA BayStars, making his NPB debut on August 8, 2019. He appeared in 21 games in his debut campaign, hitting .289/.333/.596 with 4 home runs and 7 RBI. After appearing in only 5 games during the COVID-19-affected 2020 season, Itoh only saw 3 games of action during the 2021 season, spending the majority of the year with the farm team. In 2022, Itoh played in 7 games for Yokohama, going 1-for-13.

Tohoku Rakuten Golden Eagles
On July 28, 2022, Itoh was traded to the Tohoku Rakuten Golden Eagles in exchange for Kohei Morihara. He made 3 appearances for Tohoku to close out the year, going hitless in 8 at-bats.

References 

1998 births
Living people
Baseball people from Mie Prefecture
Japanese baseball players
Rissho University alumni
Nippon Professional Baseball infielders
Yokohama DeNA BayStars players
Tohoku Rakuten Golden Eagles players